The 8th International 500-Mile Sweepstakes Race was held at the Indianapolis Motor Speedway on Monday, May 31, 1920.

Ralph DePalma held a two lap lead when the car stalled on lap 187. His riding mechanic Pete DePaolo ran to the pits to get a can of gasoline, thinking they were out of fuel. DePalma was able to get the car rolling again, and the two rejoined the race. However, during the delay, the lead went to Gaston Chevrolet. Chevrolet himself ran out of fuel on lap 197, but he was able to coast to the pits and refuel. Chevrolet held on to win.  Seven months later, he was fatally injured in a crash at Beverly Hills.

Chevrolet won the race without a single tire change, a remarkable feat at the time. Chevrolet was accompanied by riding mechanic John Bresnahan.

Time trials
Four-lap qualifying runs were introduced in 1920. Previously one-lap runs were used. None of his four laps matched the track record set the previous year.

Box score

Race details
For 1920, riding mechanics were required.
First alternate: none

References

Indianapolis 500 races
Indianapolis 500
Indianapolis 500
Indianapolis 500
Indianapolis 500